Mbuki Mvuki is the debut studio album by Plaid, independently released in 1991 on Black Dog Productions.  All tracks on this album are also contained on the first disc of the compilation Trainer, released in 2000.

Track listing
"Anything" - 5:00
"Slice Of Cheese" - 5:43
"Link" - 6:02
"Perplex" - 4:05
"Summit" - 4:38
"Bouncing Checks" - 5:29
"Yak" - 5:43
"Scoobs In Columbia" - 3:40

External links

Mbuki Mvuki at Pitchfork.com

1991 albums
Plaid (band) albums